, abbreviated from , is, in Japanese contexts, the attraction to young (or young-looking) boy characters, or media centered around this attraction. The term refers to a genre of manga and anime wherein prepubescent or pubescent male characters are depicted in a suggestive or erotic manner, whether in the obvious role of object of attraction, or the less apparent role of "subject" (the character the reader is designed to associate with).

In some stories, the young male character is paired with a male, usually in a homoerotic manner, which is most common in yaoi/Boys' Love (BL) works meant for female readers, but some of these works are male-oriented, such as Boku no Pico. In others, he is paired with a female, which the general community would call "straight shota." In some works, the shota character is paired with an older girl or woman, which is known as oneshota (おねショタ), a blend of onē-san (お姉さん, older sister) and shota. A cutoff of "about 15" has been suggested as the dividing line between shotacon and BL. It can also apply to post-pubescent (adolescent or adult) characters with neotenic features that would make them appear to be younger than they are. The phrase is a reference to the young male character  from Tetsujin 28-go (reworked in English as Gigantor). The equivalent term for attraction to (or art pertaining to erotic portrayal of) young girls is lolicon.

The usage of the term in both Western and Japanese fan cultures includes works ranging from explicitly pornographic to mildly suggestive, romantic, or in rare cases, entirely nonsexual, in which case it is not usually classified as "true" shotacon. As with lolicon, shotacon is related to the concepts of kawaii (cuteness) and moe (in which characters are presented as young, cute or helpless in order to increase reader identification and inspire protective feelings). As such, shotacon themes and characters are used in a variety of children's media. Elements of shotacon, like yaoi, are comparatively common in shōjo manga, such as the popular translated manga Loveless, which features an eroticized but unconsummated relationship between the 12-year-old male protagonist and a twenty-year-old male, or the young-appearing character Honey in Ouran High School Host Club. Seinen manga, primarily aimed at otaku, which also occasionally presents eroticized adolescent males in a non-pornographic context, such as Yoshinori "Yuki" Ikeda, the cross-dressing 14-year-old boy in Yubisaki Milk Tea.

Some critics claim that the shotacon genre contributes to actual sexual abuse of children, while others claim that there is no evidence for this, or that there is evidence to the contrary.

Origins
In the anime and manga series, Shōtarō is a bold, self-assertive detective who frequently outwits his adversaries and helps to solve cases. Throughout the series, Shōtarō develops close friends within the world. His bishōnen cuteness embodied and formed the term "shotacon", putting a name to an old sexual subculture. The word shotacon itself was coined in the magazine Fan Road in 1981.

Where the shotacon concept developed is hard to pinpoint, but some of its earliest roots are in reader responses to detective series written by Edogawa Rampo. In his works, a character named Yoshio Kobayashi of "Shōnentanteidan" (Junior Detective Group, similar to the Baker Street Irregulars of Sherlock Holmes) forms a deep dependency with adult protagonist Kogoro Akechi. Kobayashi, a beautiful teenager, constantly concerns himself with Kogoro's cases and well-being, and for a time moves in with the unmarried man. This nonsexual but intimate adult-boy relationship in part inspired the evolution of the shotacon community.

Tamaki Saitō writes that although the modern shotacon audience has a roughly even split between males and females, the genre is rumored to have roots in early 1980s dōjinshi as an offshoot of yaoi. Saitō suggests that shotacon was adopted by male readers who were influenced by lolicon; thus, he claims "shota texts by female yaoi authors are structurally identical to yaoi texts, while shota by male otaku clearly position these little boys as young girls with penises".<ref>Saitō Tamaki (2007) "Otaku Sexuality" in Christopher Bolton, Istvan Csicsery-Ronay Jr., and Takayuki Tatsumi ed., pages 236–237, Robot Ghosts and Wired Dreams. . University of Minnesota Press. .</ref> Kaoru Nagayama writes that the 1995 manga anthology U.C. BOYS: Under Cover Boys started a boom in commercial shotacon in the second half of the 1990s. During this time, male-oriented shotacon emerged and mixed with female-oriented shotacon: "the situation was such that shota works targeting women, men and a combination of both were all in close proximity." The boom collapsed at the end of the 1990s, but male-targeted shotacon saw a small resurgence starting in 2002.

Shotacon publications
Shotacon stories are commonly released in semi-monthly anthologies. Sometimes, however, manga artist will publish individual manga volumes. The 2008 Shotaket had over 1000 attendees and offered work from nearly 200 circles.

Shotacon for women is almost exclusively yaoi, and may be published in general yaoi anthology magazines or in one of the few exclusively shotacon yaoi anthologies, such as Shōnen Romance. Because of the possible legal issues, US publishers of yaoi have avoided material depicting notably underage characters. In 2006, Juné released an English translation of Mako Takahashi's  under the title "Almost Crying", a non-erotic shotacon manga; the book contains several stories featuring pubescent male characters, but their relationships are nonsexual.

Shotacon for male readers may feature either homosexual or heterosexual relationships. Both gay and straight shotacon typically involve escapades between smaller, often pubescent males and young adults (older brother/sister figures), sexually frustrated authority figures (teacher/boss), significantly older "uncle/aunt" figures (neighborhood acquaintances, actual family members), or outright father or mother figures (adopted, step, or full blood relation). Outside of these tropes, stories that involve only young boys (with no older characters) are not rare, with the most common recurring theme being a classmate relation.

Shota stories may be published in (a subset of) general seijin (men's pornographic) manga anthologies or in the few seijin shota manga anthologies, such as Shōnen Ai no Bigaku, which specializes in male-male stories. Some gay men's magazines which offer a particularly broad mix of pornographic material occasionally run stories or manga featuring peri-pubescent characters.

In 2006, the seijin shotacon OVA anime , which the producer has described as the first shotacon anime, was released. It was later followed by two sequels and an edited version of the first OVA, with content more suitable for viewers under 18, as well as a video game starring Pico and Chico, the main characters of the anime. However, three years previously an OVA based on the eroge Enzai'' was created, featuring explicit sexual acts involving young boys.

See also
 Hentai
 List of manga magazines – includes shotacon magazines
 Lolicon
 Yaoi

Legal aspects
 Cartoon pornography
 Child pornography
 Legal status of cartoon pornography
 Legal status of drawn pornography depicting minors
 Legal status of Internet pornography
 Pornography in Japan
 Simulated child pornography

Explanatory notes

References

External links 

Anime and manga genres
Anime and manga controversies
Anime and manga terminology
Hentai
Japanese sex terms
Male stock characters in anime and manga
Animation controversies
LGBT-related controversies in animation
LGBT-related controversies in television
LGBT-related controversies in literature
LGBT-related controversies in video games
Obscenity controversies in animation
Obscenity controversies in comics
Obscenity controversies in video games
Pedophilia
Wasei-eigo
Boys